Pareuchaetes misantlensis is a moth of the subfamily Arctiinae. It was described by Alfredo Rei do Régo Barros in 1956. It is found in Mexico.

References

Phaegopterina
Moths described in 1956